Siddhagiri Gramjivan Museum (Kaneri Math) at Kaneri, Kolhapur   district, Maharashtra, is a sculpture museum. The full name is Siddhagiri Gramjivan (Village life) Museum. It is situated at Shri Kshetra Siddhagiri Math, a campus built around the Moola-Kaadsiddheswar Shiva temple.

Museum description
This museum showcases different aspects of Gramjivan (village life). Gram means village and jeevan means life in the Marathi language. This initiative was the dream of Mahatma Gandhi, and was created through the vision and efforts of Siddhagiri Gurukul Foundation co. The history of self-sufficient village life in Maharshtra, before the invasion of the Mughals, is depicted in the form of cement sculptures. Each sculpture is lifelike and represents activities performed in daily village life. There were 12 Balutedars (essentially artisan castes), and 18 Alutedars who provided equipment to carry out domestic and professional tasks.

Every aspect of village life has been depicted in almost 80 scenes that showcase more than 300 statues.

Village scenes
The scenes of village life include:
 Village priest’s abode. The first scene is the house of a highly educated village priest. He performs his duties, rites and rituals like weddings and thread ceremonies, and is tasked to find auspicious days and times for any major activity such as house-building and house-warming activities, digging wells, sowing seeds, piercing nose or ears. He earns his livelihood from Dakshina (donations) he receives. He consults the Panchaang (almanac) for finding auspicious dates.
 Goldsmith at work
 Ironsmith shoeing a bullock
 Barber shop
 Village well - villagers fetching water from the public well.
 Nursing an elder family member
 Grocer’s shop - a woman visiting the grocery shop with her son. The shop-keeper is weighing items in an old weighing machine. Items like jaggery, sugar, chillies, salt, wheat, and rice are stocked. The son is asking his mother to buy kites for him.
 Farmer’s wada (house)
 House of Vaidya
 Grandma stitching a godhadi (quilt)
 Farmers ploughing his farm using a bullock-drawn plow
 Shepherd boy with his herd of sheep
 Villagers performing Bhajan and Kirtan (singing Hindu devotional songs)

Shiva temple
The museum has an old Shiva temple on the grounds. It is related to the Inchegeri Sampradaya, to which Nisargadatta Maharaj belongs. It is believed that a Shivling was installed by a Lingayat Priest on a beautiful hill in the 14th century. About 500 years ago, a Lingayat Priest, Shree Kadsiddheshwar Maharaj, developed and renovated it, and hence the place is now known by his name. The temple includes a -deep well, a  Shiva idol, and a large Nandi bull.

References

External links
 Siddhagiri Museum
 Shri Kshetra Siddhagiri Math
 Kaneri Math
 Gramjivan Museum (Kaneri Math)

Museums in Maharashtra
Kolhapur
Wax museums in India
History museums in India
Inchegeri Sampradaya
Tourist attractions in Kolhapur district
Buildings and structures in Kolhapur
Year of establishment missing